Belafonte '89 is a live album by Harry Belafonte, released in 1989. A truncated version of the album was released in the U.S., featuring only 10 out of 15 tracks. The international CD release was also truncated, featuring 13 tracks. It was also released in Germany  as Stationen in 1990, and 1993. The CD release of Stationen from 1990 contains all 15 tracks.

Track listing 
 "The Wave" (Jake Holmes, Richard Cummings, The Soul Brothers) – 4:20	 
 "Kwela" (Holmes, S. M. Nkabinda) – 6:36	 
 "Island In The Sun" (Lord Burgess, Harry Belafonte) – 5:04	 
 "Skin to Skin" (Holmes, Godfrey Nelson) – 4:50	 
 "Paradise in Gazankulu" (Holmes, Oben Ngobeni) – 8:30	 
 "Jamaica Farewell" (Burgess) – 5:49	 
 "Try To Remember" (Tom Jones, Harvey Schmidt) – 4:36	 
 "Sing for the Song" (Bob Gibson) – 4:20	 
 "Matilda" (Thomas) – 8:46	 
 "Martin Luther King" (Holmes) – 6:46	 
 "Global Carnival" (Holmes, Alistair Coakley) – 5:32	 
 "We Make Love" (Holmes) – 4:19	 
 "Hava Nageela" (Traditional) – 3:49	 
 "Did You Know" (Holmes) – 4:45	 
 "Day-O (The Banana Boat Song)"  (William Attaway, Irving Burgie) – 5:35

Personnel 
 Harry Belafonte – vocals
 Diane Reeves – vocals on "Skin to Skin"
 Demetrius Harvey – vocals on "Try to Remember"
 Richard Cummings – keyboards, piano
 Jose Neto – guitar
 Angus Nunes – bass
 Neil Clarke – African and Latin percussion
 Chi Sharpe – African and Latin percussion
 Sipho Kunene – drums
 Benny Russell – saxophone, flute, pennywhistle
 Sharon Brooks – background vocals
 Deborah Sharpe – background vocals
 Ty Stephens – background vocals
 Cheryl Carter – background vocals
 Dwight Twiddle – background vocals
 Johan Beckles – background vocals
 Renee Crutcher – background vocals
 Demetrius Harvey – background vocals
Production notes:
 John Cartwright – producer
 Harry Belafonte – producer, liner notes
 Richard Cummings – conductor, arranger
 David Belafonte – assistant producer, mixing
 Bob Burnham – engineer, assistant producer

References 

Harry Belafonte live albums
1989 live albums
EMI Records live albums